Nathan Chapman may refer to:
Nathan Chapman (soldier), first American killed in the Invasion of Afghanistan
Nathan Chapman (footballer), Australian rules footballer
Nathan Chapman (record producer), country music record producer and session musician